Henry Chamberlain may refer to:

Sir Henry Chamberlain, 1st Baronet (1773–1829), British diplomat
Sir Henry Chamberlain, 2nd Baronet (1796–1843), British Army officer and artist
For subsequent Chamberlain baronets, see Chamberlain baronets 
Henry Chamberlain (Michigan politician) (1824–1907), Michigan politician
Henry Chamberlin (1925–1888), New Zealand politician often spelled Chamberlain
Henry Chamberlain, a character on the TV series The Secret Circle 
Boeta Chamberlain (Henry Chamberlain, born 1999), South African rugby union player

See also

Chamberlain (surname)